José Rafael Abinader Wasaf (2 March 1929 – 4 November 2018) was a politician, lawyer and writer from the Dominican Republic and Vice-President of the Dominican Revolutionary Party. He founded the Universidad Dominicana O&M, in which he was rector. Abinader as a businessman was president of Grupo Abicor, and at the time of his death he was worth US$600 million. 

Jose Rafael Abinader was the son of José S. Abinader, a Lebanese immigrant from Baskinta, Mount Lebanon, who arrived to the country in 1898, and Esther Wassaf, born in Monte Cristi to Lebanese parents from Baskinta as well. When he was 11 years old, his family moved from the town of Tamboril to the hamlet of Gurabito (located on the outskirts of Santiago de los Caballeros).

He studied law, and got a doctorate. He married Rosa S. Corona Caba, and had 3 children, among them the businessman and politician Luis Abinader.

Abinader was a member of the National Executive Committee of the Dominican Revolutionary Party starting in 1963.

He was Minister of Finance of the Dominican Republic in 1965 and from 1982 to 1984.

He founded the Dominican Social Alliance party (ASD; now the Modern Revolutionary Party or PRM); in 1998 he was elected Senator for the Santiago Province in an alliance with the Dominican Revolutionary Party.

Abinader was the ASD's presidential candidate for three times: 1982, 1990 and 1996. Thirty-four years after Abinader's first presidential campaign, his son Luis Abinader became the presidential candidate of that party (although renamed to the PRM) for the 2016 general election. and the 2020 general election, winning the latter.

Works 
 "Ideas económicas y sociales"
 "Comentarios acerca del ahorro"
 "Bosquejo de un estudio económico"
 "La corrupción administrativa en América Latina"
 "La sociedad bajo escrutinio"
 "Poemas antiguos"

References 

1929 births
2018 deaths
Finance ministers of the Dominican Republic
People from Santiago Province (Dominican Republic)
Dominican Republic people of Lebanese descent
20th-century Dominican Republic lawyers
Dominican Republic politicians
Dominican Revolutionary Party politicians
Members of the Senate of the Dominican Republic
Candidates for President of the Dominican Republic
Dominican Republic Roman Catholics